The 1973 Oregon Webfoots football team represented the University of Oregon during the 1973 NCAA Division I football season.  and final year as head coach, Dick Enright led the Ducks to a  record  in Pac-8, tied 

Six weeks after the season ended, Enright was fired by athletic director Norv Ritchey in early  with the university buying out the remainder of his four-year  He was immediately succeeded by assistant coach  who handled quarterbacks and receivers for the past two seasons.

Schedule

Roster

All-conference

Three Oregon underclassmen were named to the All-Pac-8 team: tight end Russ Francis, defensive back Steve Donnelly, and defensive tackle Reggie Lewis. Francis and Donnelly were juniors and Lewis was a sophomore.

NFL Draft

Two Oregon seniors were selected in the draft; tackle Tim Guy (122nd) and defensive back Jack Conners (400th).
List of Oregon Ducks in the NFL draft

References

 McCann, Michael C. (1995). Oregon Ducks Football: 100 Years of Glory. Eugene, OR: McCann Communications Corp. .

Oregon
Oregon Ducks football seasons
Oregon Webfoots football